Kenilworth School and Sixth Form, also known as Kenilworth School and Sports College, is a coeducational secondary school and sixth form based in both Leyes Lane (Secondary School) & Rouncil Lane (Sixth Form), Kenilworth, Warwickshire, England.

History
Built in 1961 Kenilworth School was three schools from the 1960s until 1974, Abbey High School, Castle High School & Kenilworth Grammar School. The three sites were then merged into Kenilworth School, with Castle High School becoming Castle Sixth Form, the Grammar school becoming Priory Hall and Abbey remaining as it was. Both Halls were then overseen by the Principal of Kenilworth School who was Mr Wilson. In 1990 Priory became Upper school and Abbey became Lower and the concept of one Principal and three Headteachers (Abbey, Priory and Castle) was done away with in favour of one Headteacher of all three sites. The name changed to Kenilworth School & Sports College.

In February 2013 the school was inspected by Ofsted – the grading awarded was 1 (Outstanding) in every category (Leadership & Management / Teaching & Learning / Behaviour & Safety / Achievement) this was an improvement on the previous inspection 5 years previous where the school was awarded 2 (good) under the old Ofsted framework.

Previously a foundation school administered by Warwickshire County Council, in January 2019 Kenilworth School & Sports College converted to academy status and was renamed Kenilworth School & Sixth Form.

The school will relocate to the site of Southcrest Farm on Glasshouse Lane in September 2023 expanding the capacity to 2200 pupils, having taken ownership of the new site in December 2020.

In 2020 a memoir of Kenilworth School was published by ex-pupil Lance Manley. Entitled '6 of One' it covers the period 1977 to 1990 and was written by Lance and 27 other ex-pupils and one former teacher. All profits are being donated to Northleigh House School in Warwick, a school for vulnerable children.

Headteachers

Kenilworth Grammar School

Mr Robert Mitchell (1961-1974)

Mr Farrell (1974 - 1978?)

Abbey High School

Miss Dorothy Parncutt

Castle High School

Mr. Jeremy 1956 - 1970

Kenilworth School

Mr Wilson (Principal) (1974- 1990)

Mr Crowther (Priory Hall) (1974- 1990)

Mr Hughes (Abbey Hall) (1974- 1990)

Kenilworth School & Sports College

Dr Alex Begbie (1990- 2008)

Mr Hayden Abbot (2008–present)

School today
Today, the school retains its three sites: Lower School, Upper School and Sixth Form. Each site is the main area for a certain key stage.

Lower School
Lower School is for students in Key Stage 3 (Year 7, 8 and 9). The Building of Lower School accommodates Lower School students for the registration period (tutor time) and break-times. Lower School is also the home of the library and the dance studio. Lower School also holds various subjects.

The Subjects taught in the Lower School buildings are;
 Science – Biology,
 Humanities (History, Geography, Religious Studies, Latin and Citizenship),
 Languages (French, Spanish and German),
 Technology (Resistant Materials, Textiles, Food and Graphics),
 Computer Science

Upper School
Upper School is for students who are studying GCSEs (Year 10 and 11). The Building of Upper School accommodates Upper School students for the registration period (tutor time) and break-times. Upper School is also the home of the drama studio. Like the Lower school, Upper school also holds various subjects.
 This site was formerly the site of Kenilworth Grammar School.
The Subjects taught in the Upper School buildings are:
 Science – Chemistry and Physics,
 Mathematics,
 English,
 The Expressive Arts (Art, Drama and Music),
 Physical Education,
 Business Studies,
 Special needs Department,
 Computer Science

Sixth Form

The Sixth Form is where students take A level education. Based in Rouncil Lane, Kenilworth students can take a wide range of subjects providing they have the correct GCSEs usually 5 A* to C including English and Mathematics. The majority of Sixth Form students will move onto some form of Further Education (usually university) after leaving the Sixth Form.

In 2013, Ofsted reviewed the Sixth Form and scored it with a 1 for 'outstanding'.

Some students study for BTEC qualifications. Students may also take part in the consortium scheme, so they study other subjects at other local sixth forms.

Meadows Sports Centre
The Meadows Sports Centre is an en-suite sports complex including a hall, fitness centre, men's and women's changing rooms and a new 'astroturf'. The sports complex, as well as being used by the school, is also used in 'out of school' hours allowing members of the public to use it. Various sports are played in the sports complex, including football, athletics, badminton, basketball and hockey. It was built partially using money from the school becoming a sports college to get more funding.

References

External links 
 Kenilworth School and Sports College
 Official Kenilworth Youth Radio (Working in partnership with Kenilworth School and Sports College, no longer in operation)

Secondary schools in Warwickshire
Kenilworth
Academies in Warwickshire